GHOSTS/ALIENS is a humor book written by the pseudonymous Trey Hamburger.  The book chronicles the research of two amateur scientists, Trey Hamburger and Mike Stevens, who investigate the possible teleportation of a hot pocket.  The investigation soon expands to psychic babies, "Indians", the efficacy of toothpaste foam, the dangers caused by floating pillows, states of bird consciousness, portals in space/time, and so on.

The author sends letters to actual scientists requesting advice about the existence of ghosts, aliens, inter-dimensional portals as well as advice about paranormal combat.  Those letters and replies are published in the book.

Author
The author of GHOSTS/ALIENS is also the author of REAL Ultimate Power: The Official Ninja Book.  In the 'Hamburger mythology', Trey Hamburger is the cousin of Robert Hamburger, the protagonist of REAL Ultimate Power.

Television and film
U.S. Cable TV network Comedy Central has acquired the television rights to GHOSTS/ALIENS, and Paramount Vantage has acquired the film rights. The pilot titled GHOSTS/ALIENS was directed by Michael Patrick Jann, director of RENO 911.

References

External links
 ghostsaliens.net, official website
 

2008 non-fiction books
Supernatural books